The 2005 Italian Figure Skating Championships was held in Merano from January 7 through 9, 2005. Skaters competed in the disciplines of men's singles, ladies' singles, and ice dancing on the levels of senior and junior. The results were used to choose the teams to the 2005 World Championships, the 2005 European Championships, and the 2005 World Junior Championships.

Senior results

Men

Ladies

Ice dancing

External links
 results

Italian Figure Skating Championships
2004 in figure skating
Italian Figure Skating Championships, 2005
2004 in Italian sport
2005 in Italian sport